Michael Reich (born 18 October 1945) is a Polish-born economist who primarily focuses on labor economics and political economy. Currently, Reich is a professor of economics and co-chair of the Center on Wage and Employment Dynamics at the Institute for Research on Labor and Employment (IRLE) at the University of California at Berkeley. He served as director of IRLE from 2004 to 2015. In 1968, he helped found the Union for Radical Political Economics.

Early life and education 

Michael Reich was born in Trzebina, Poland, to Polish-Jewish parents who survived the Holocaust. In 1949, his family moved to the United States where Reich attended public schools in New York City, Swarthmore College for his undergraduate degree in 1966, and Harvard University to earn a PhD in economics.

Reich notes that he was a "child of the Sputnik age", thus he initially attended college with ambitions to become a physicist, focusing primarily in the fields of science and mathematics. However, his college years changed him as he became heavily involved in activist movements, including protests against the United States’ military role in the Vietnam War. It was during this time that Reich subscribed to the New Left movement.

Union for Radical Political Economics 

In 1968, while in graduate school, Reich was a founding member of the Union for Radical Political Economics (URPE). In doing so, as Reich describes in a biographical compilation piece (A Biographical Dictionary of Dissenting Economists), he helped "to organize an influential circle of radical economists." URPE's agenda, as described by a spokesperson for the group, is to:

support an American version of socialism, with public ownership of production and a government-planned economy to meet social needs rather than the needs of private profit.

URPE is highly critical of capitalism, and seeks to offer alternatives to the traditional capitalist system, largely pointing to a form of socialism. Reich describes that the group's "radical economic perspective" was molded through the convergence of various movements, including antiwar, civil rights, and student power. Reich was a member of the editorial boards of URPE's Review of Radical Political Economics and the Socialist Review.

In 1972, the members of URPE formally assembled their ideas and published a widely cited textbook on radical economics, The Capitalist System. As the central thesis of the textbook's first edition, the group:

regarded capitalism as deeply implicated in the multiple oppressions that we saw around us: inequality, alienation, racism, sexism, imperialism, waste and irrationality.

Reich contributed at least four articles to The Capitalist System, including a reprinting of "The Economics of Racism". Upon the book's release, the Journal of Economic Issues published a review of the book, summarizing it as "...a massive indictment of the contemporary American economic system. It is cast in Marxian terminology but stripped of some of Marx’s turgidity and excess verbiage."

Career 

In the 1960s and 1970s, Reich worked with David Gordon, Richard Edwards, and other well-known Marxist and Neo-Marxian economists. Focusing on labor economics, the group specifically narrowed in on segmented labor markets. In 1973, Reich, together with Edwards and Gordon, published A Theory of Labor Market Segmentation.

Reich was a teacher at Boston University for three years, and then in 1974 became an assistant professor of economics at the University of California at Berkeley. In 1989, he was promoted to full professor. According to Reich, he regularly taught courses at Berkeley in Marxist economics, political economy, and the history of economic thought.

Reich serves as director of the Institute for Research on Labor and Employment (IRLE) at UC Berkeley, and co-chairs IRLE's Center for Wage and Employment Dynamics (CWED). He has also served as editor of the publication Industrial Relations, of Berkeley's Institute of Industrial Relations.

Reich has produced research for the progressive public policy advocacy organization, the Center for American Progress. In 2010, he produced a report for the organization investigating the economic proposals of California gubernatorial candidate Meg Whitman. An economist at the Hoover Institution at Stanford University responded to Reich's report with evidence showing a negative effect of Reich's proposals.

On June 25, 2013, Reich testified before the United States Senate Committee on Health, Education, Labor and Pensions at a hearing discussing the 75th anniversary of the federal minimum wage. Reich testified in favor of a minimum wage increase, defending his reports against other contradicting research.

Controversy 

Reich's analyses on the effects of minimum wage increases in his capacity at IRLE have generated controversy and accusations of bias from Los Angeles city legislators. Addressing IRLE's selection to analyze a proposed minimum wage hike in Los Angeles to $15.25, Democratic City Councilman Felipe Fuentes argued that "the selection of U.C. Berkeley, by perception, compromises the possibility of a fair and balanced discussion." Fuentes and fellow Democratic Councilman Mitch O'Farrell asked to reopen the selection process for a research team "so that we can engage in a process that is worthy of our employers, workers and their families, and the well-being of our economy."

In March 2016, the Albany Times Union reported on hundreds of pages of emails from Reich's research team that showed a close collaboration between the research team and labor union groups that fund the movement to raise the minimum wage. According to the article, “the relationship between academic and funder seemed explicit” with one uncovered email showing that the research team was seeking grant money to support its research "for local groups engaged in work to raise the minimum wage" and “testimony/media work” in California.

In July 2017, Seattle Weekly reported it had obtained emails through a public disclosure request showing that Reich had coordinated a June 2017 Seattle minimum wage study with a minimum wage advocacy group, a pro minimum wage public relations firm, and Seattle Mayor Ed Murray's staff. The emails show Reich accelerated the timeline of his report to preempt a soon to be released University of Washington study that came to the opposite conclusion.

References

Further reading 
 

1950 births
Harvard University alumni
Labor economists
Living people
Polish Marxists
Polish economists
Swarthmore College alumni